Luciano Gómez (born 22 March 1996) is an Argentine professional footballer who plays as a right-back or winger for Argentine Primera División team Independiente.

Career
Gómez began with Banfield, with his debut coming in the Argentine Primera División against Arsenal de Sarandí on 12 February 2016.

In July 2021, Gómez joined Argentinos Juniors on loan for the rest of 2021 with a purchase option. In January 2022, the club triggered the option to sign him on a permanently deal.

Career statistics
.

References

External links
 

1996 births
Living people
People from Corrientes
Argentine footballers
Association football defenders
Association football wingers
Argentine Primera División players
Club Atlético Banfield footballers
Argentinos Juniors footballers
Sportspeople from Corrientes Province